Chitrakoot Dham, is a city and pilgrimage centre in the Chitrakoot district in the state of Uttar Pradesh, India.  Chitrakoot Dham is the district headquarters and has a municipal board. Chitrakoot Dham is a city situated 12 miles west of Karwi.

History

Ancient History 
Renowned in Indian literature and sacred texts, Chitrakoot, the abode of Lord Rama, Mother Sita and Lakshmana's of Shri Ram for eleven and a half years during the exile, is capable of purifying the human heart and attracting tourists with the charm of nature. Chitrakoot is a natural place which is famous for its spiritual importance along with natural scenery. A tourist is enthralled by the beautiful waterfalls, playful young deer and dancing peacocks, while a pilgrim is enthralled by taking a dip in Payaswani/Mandakini and engrossed in the dust of Kamadgiri. Chitrakoot region has been a living center of inspiration for cosmic consciousness since ancient times. Thousands of monks, sages and sages have attained high spiritual status here and have done their penance, sadhana, yoga, He has made a beneficial impact on the world through penance and various hard spiritual endeavors. Nature has very generously bestowed all its gifts on the region, which enables it to attract pilgrims and tourists from all over the world. Atri, Anusuya, Dattatreya, Maharishi Markandeya, Sarabhanga, Sutikshna and various other sages, saints, devotees and thinkers all spent their ages in this area and according to the experts, many such people are still doing penance in various caves and other areas here. . Thus the region has a spiritual fragrance, which permeates the entire atmosphere and makes each and every day here spiritually alive. Devotees and thinkers all spent their lives in this area and according to the experts, many such people are still doing penance in various caves and other areas here. Thus the region has a spiritual fragrance, which permeates the entire atmosphere and makes each and every day here spiritually alive. Devotees and thinkers all spent their lives in this area and according to the experts, many such people are still doing penance in various caves and other areas here. Thus the region has a spiritual fragrance, which permeates the entire atmosphere and makes each and every day here spiritually alive.

Chitrakoot is the pilgrimage of all pilgrimages. According to Hindu belief, Prayagraj is considered the king of all pilgrimages; But Chitrakoot has been given a higher position than that. Legend has it that when Chitrakoot did not reach Prayagraj like other pilgrimages, Prayagraj was told about the higher status of Chitrakoot and Prayagraj was expected to visit Chitrakoot, On the contrary, come here to Chitrakoot. It is also believed that Prayagraj comes every year to wash away his sins by bathing in Payaswani. It is also said that when Lord Rama performed the Shradh ceremony of his father, all the gods and goddesses came to Chitrakoot to participate in the Shuddhi Bhoja (a feast given to all relatives and friends on the thirteenth day after the death of someone in the family). They were captivated by the beauty of this place. A spiritual dimension was added to it in the presence of Lord Rama. So they were not ready to go back. Vice-Chancellor Vashishtha, realizing his desire to live and live according to the wishes of Lord Rama, forgot to chant the immersion (departure) mantra. Thus, all the gods and goddesses have made this place their permanent abode and are always present there. Even today, even when a lone tourist can visit ancient rocks, caves, When one reaches this place scattered with the opulence of ashrams and temples, he unknowingly loses himself in an environment filled with sacred rites and teachings and creations of enlightenment and the joys of a different world. receives. Thousands of pilgrims and seekers of truth from all parts of the world take shelter in this place inspired by an insatiable desire to improve and upgrade their lives.

Chitrakoot has a distinctive name and identity since ancient times. The first known mention of this place is in the Valmiki Ramayana, which is believed to be the first epic composed by the earliest poet. As an unwritten structure, this epic of evolution was handed down from generation to generation by oral tradition. The fame and antiquity of the place can be well denoted by Valmiki, who is believed to be a contemporary (or before him) of Rama, and is believed to have composed the Ramayana before Rama's birth. . Maharishi Valmiki portrays Chitrakoot as a great holy place, inhabited by great sages and where monkeys, Bears and a variety of other fauna and flora are found. Sage Bharadwaja and Valmiki both speak about this region in admiring words and advise Sri Rama to make it his abode during the period of his exile, Because this place was able to fulfill all the desires of a person and give him peace of mind. So that he can achieve the highest goals in his life. Lord Rama himself acknowledges the spiritual effect of this place. Chitrakoot one has a special place in the 'Ramopakhyan' and the description of pilgrimages at various places in the Mahabharata. These 'Adhyatma Ramayana' and 'Brihat Ramayana' attest to the shocking spiritual and natural beauty of Chitrakoot. According to the authors, later the description of Chitrakoot and its main places is described as sixteen Kanto. This place has been accorded a unique distinction in the entire Indian literature related to Rama. Father Kamil Bulke also mentions 'Chitrakoot-Mahatmya' which is found in Mackenzie's collection. Various Sanskrit and Hindi poets have described Chitrakoot. Mahakavi Kalidas has given a beautiful description of this place in his epic 'Raghuvansh'. He was so impressed by the attraction here that he made Chitrakoot (which he called Ramagiri because of its revered relationship with Lord Rama) in Meghdoot, the place of his Yaksha's exile. Tulsidas ji, the saint-poet of Hindi, has mentioned this place with utmost respect in all his major works- Ramcharit Manas, Kavitavali, Dohavali and Vinay Patrika. The final text contains several verses, displaying a deeply personal bond between Tulsidas and Chitrakoot. He spent a considerable part of his life here worshiping Lord Rama and longing for his darshan. Here is considered a remarkable moment of his achievements when he got the darshan of his beloved Lord Rama in the mediation of Hanuman ji. His friend, the famous Hindi poet Rahim (Abdur Rahim Khan e Khana, soldier, politician, saint, scholar, poet, who was one of the Nav-Ratnas of Akbar) spent some time here when he was on the side of Emperor Jahangir, the son of Akbar. According to the Beatak literature of the Pranami sect, the saint poet Mahamati Prananath wrote two of his books - Chhota Qayamatnama and Bada Qayamatnama here. The exact place where Prannath lived and where he did the work related to the interpretation of the Quran and its similarities with the Srimad Bhagwat Mahapurana could not be ascertained.

Modern History 
In Uttar Pradesh, on 6 May 1997, a new district was created in the name of Chhatrapati Shahu Ji Maharaj Nagar by cutting it out of Banda district, which included Karvi and Mau tehsils. After some time, the name of the district was changed to Chitrakoot on 4 September 1998. It is situated in the northern Vindhya range spread across the states of Uttar Pradesh and Madhya Pradesh. The major part here is included in Chitrakoot of Uttar Pradesh and Satna district of Madhya Pradesh. The word "Chitrakoot" used here signifies the rich and diverse cultural, religious, historical and archaeological heritage of the various places and sites of the region. Every new moon, lakhs of devotees from different regions gather here. Somvati Amavasya, Deepawali, Sharad-Purnima, Makar-Sankranti and Ram Navami are special occasions of such celebrations here. It is a serene and beautiful spiritual place, it will give you the feeling of Shri Ram Maya in every particle.

Geography
The city is bounded in the north by Kaushambi, in the south by Satna (M.P.) and Rewa (M.P.), in the east by Prayagraj and in the west by Banda. Chitrakoot Dham is situated on the bank of Mandakini (Payaswini) River. The terrain is mountainous.

Demographics
 India census Chitrakoot Dham had a population of 66,426. Males constitute 54% of the population and females 46%. Chitrakoot Dham has an average literacy rate of 67%, with male literacy of 75% and female literacy of 58%. 16% of the population is under 6 years of age.

Educational Institutes
 Baijnath Bharadwaj Saraswati Vidya Mandir
 Chitrakoot Inter College (CIC)
 Gyan Bharti School
 Jagadguru Rambhadracharya Handicapped University, Sitapur
 Mahatma Gandhi Chitrakoot Gramodaya University
 Seth Moolchand Vidya Mandir
 St Thomas Sr.Sec.school

Transport

Road 
Chitrakoot Dham Karwi have National Highway 35, and National Highway 731A. NH35 gives connectivity to Varanasi and Jhansi. NH731A gives connectivity to Kaushambi,Pratapgarah,Raibareli.

Ram Gaman Path

There is proposed Ram Gaman Path will be 210 km long six lane expressway which will connect Chitrakoot to Kaushambi,Pratapgarh,Shringverpur Dham, Sultanpur and until Ayodhya

Expressway

Chitrakoot is connected by Bundelkhand Expressway which starts from Chitrakoot.It is 296 km long expressway which is connected to Agra Lucknow Expressway and gives easy connectivity until Delhi

Railways 
Chitrakoot Dham has a railway station Chitrakoot Dham Karwi on the Manikpur - Jhansi/Kanpur main line, served by the North-Central division of Indian Railways. It is connected by train to Delhi, Mumbai, Kolkata, Bhopal, Raipur, Jabalpur, Kanpur, Khajuraho, Lucknow, Durg and Varanasi.

Airport 

Chitrakoot Airport is the nearest airport serving the city. Government of India has planned to connect this airport under UDAAN scheme, which is intended to connect smaller airports in the country for passenger services.

Attractions

 Ramghat–This is a major ghat. 100–150 rs buy a one-hour personal shikara (Big Boat) Many boats host pet rabbits. Tulsidas statue is there on the ghat. Bharat Milap temple is on this ghat. Arati happens each evening. This is a central place in Chitrakoot.
 Kamadgiri Parikrama–This trail covers around 5 km. Monkeys are common and ill-behaved.
 Hanuman Dhara–This hill has three main points of interest: Trimukhi Hanuman mandir, Panchmukhi hanuman mandir and Seeta Rasoi. A continuous stream of water falls on Hanuman idol. Buy grams of "Chana" and feed langurs here. Langurs are present. Sita Rasoi is an old room where Sitaji cooked food during ram vanvas.
 Gupt Godavari Caves–Water streams flow through these three caves. 
 Sphatic Shila–This is a stone where Lord Ram used to rest.
 Sati Anusuiya Ashram–This is an ashram on the river bank.
 Ganesh Bagh- The last Durbar of Peshwas of India , It is also called as mini khajuraho
 Sanhok Lake View

See also
2009 Chitrakoot shootout

References

External links
 Chitrakoot, Karwi tehsil, The Imperial Gazetteer of India, 1909, v. 10, p. 300

Cities and towns in Chitrakoot district
Tourist attractions in Uttar Pradesh